Calculus is a branch of mathematics focused on limits, functions, derivatives, integrals, and infinite series. This subject constitutes a major part of contemporary mathematics education. Calculus has widespread applications in science, economics, and engineering and can solve many problems for which algebra alone is insufficient.

Branches of calculus 
 Differential calculus
 Integral calculus
 Multivariable calculus
 Fractional calculus
Differential Geometry

History of calculus 
 History of calculus
 Important publications in calculus

General calculus concepts 
 Continuous function
 Derivative
 Fundamental theorem of calculus
 Integral
 Limit
 Non-standard analysis
 Partial derivative
 Infinite Series

Calculus scholars 

 Sir Isaac Newton
 Gottfried Leibniz

Calculus lists 
 List of calculus topics

See also 
 Glossary of calculus
 Table of mathematical symbols

References

External links 

 
 
 Calculus Made Easy (1914) by Silvanus P. Thompson Full text in PDF
 Calculus.org: The Calculus page at University of California, Davis – contains resources and links to other sites
COW: Calculus on the Web at Temple University - contains resources ranging from pre-calculus and associated algebra
Online Integrator (WebMathematica) from Wolfram Research
The Role of Calculus in College Mathematics from ERICDigests.org
OpenCourseWare Calculus from the Massachusetts Institute of Technology
 Infinitesimal Calculus – an article on its historical development, in Encyclopaedia of Mathematics, Michiel Hazewinkel ed.

Calculus
Calculus

Calculus